Basic Education High School No. 3 Myitkyina is a public high school located in Myitkyina, Myanmar.

High schools in Kachin State